Girl Guides Singapore (GGS; Malay: Pandu Puteri Singapura) is the national Guiding organisation of Singapore. It was first established in 1917 as The Singapore Girl Guides Association, before being renamed to its current iteration on 24 July 2004. The girls-only organisation became a full member of the World Association of Girl Guides and Girl Scouts in 1966 and serves 12,340 members.

Program and ideals
The association is divided in three sections according to age:
 Brownies - ages 7 to 12
 Guides - ages 12 to 16/17
 Young Adults - ages 17 to 25
The Girl Guide emblem incorporates the letters P P, for Pandu Puteri Singapura, Girl Guides Singapore in Malay, the National Language of Singapore.

Guide Promise
I promise to do my best,
To do my duty to God,
To serve my country and
help other people, and
To keep the Guide Law.

Brownie Promise
I promise to do my best, 
To do my duty to God, 
to serve my country 
and help other people,
and to keep the Brownie Law.

Guide Law
 A Guide is loyal and can be trusted.
 A Guide is useful and helps others.
 A Guide is polite, considerate and respects her elders.
 A Guide is friendly and a sister to all Guides.
 A Guide is kind to all living things.
 A Guide is obedient.
 A Guide has courage and is cheerful in all difficulties.
 A Guide takes care of her own possessions and those of other people.
 A Guide is thrifty and diligent.
 A Guide is self-disciplined in what she thinks, says and does.

Guide Motto
The Guide motto is: Be Prepared.

Brownie Motto
Lend A Hand.

Young Adult Leader Motto
The Young Adult Leader motto is: To Serve.

See also
The Singapore Scout Association

External links
Official website

World Association of Girl Guides and Girl Scouts member organizations
Scouting and Guiding in Singapore
Youth organizations established in 1917